T Microscopii is a semiregular variable star in the constellation Microscopium. It ranges from magnitude 6.74 to 8.11 over a period of 352 days.

References

Microscopium
Microscopii, T
Semiregular variable stars
M-type giants
100935
194676
Durchmusterung objects
Emission-line stars